Héctor Faúndez (1960 – March 3, 2007) was a Chilean diplomat.

Chilean diplomats
People murdered in Syria
1960 births
2007 deaths